Léo Berdeu (born 13 June 1998) is a French rugby union player, who plays for Lyon as a Fly-half.

He was first selected for the French national rugby team in January 2022, for the following Six Nations tournament.

References

External link

1998 births
Sportspeople from Cannes
Living people
French rugby union players
Rugby union fly-halves
Lyon OU players
SU Agen Lot-et-Garonne players